Minute of Islands is a 2021 puzzle-platform game developed by Studio Fizbin and published by Mixtvision for Microsoft Windows, Nintendo Switch, PlayStation 4 and Xbox One.

Gameplay 

The player plays as Mo, a mechanic who is tasked with saving the world by restoring engines on an archipelago. The player moves around the 2D world, and can climb and jump up objects. The player can use a tool, the Omni Switch, which allows Mo to use mechanisms and solve puzzles. The tool also can also show the player the direction they need to go to next. The game also has collectibles hidden around the islands, which reveal more about the world and story.

Reception 

In a positive review for Rock Paper Shotgun, Alice Bell wrote that the puzzles were simplistic, but were enjoyable. "The puzzles are mostly about getting from A to B, although there are giant logic gates in the underground machines that are more complicated. They're made to feel like giant bodies themselves, the power lines like sticky veins, and you have to push connecting blocks back into place and then find your way back out again. It's not challenging, but it is satisfying". Bell also praised the themes of the story, "Minute Of Islands' story... isn't necessarily subtle... But for all its narrative bluntness, Minute Of Islands is an incredibly elegant game. Much more so than the most other indie games that are about death and grief and sadness and responsibility."

Malindy Hetfeld, writing for Eurogamer, criticized Minute of Islands' gameplay, writing "It looks like rote, simple work when Mo does it, one of the few times you see her arms emerge from between the folds of her yellow coat. Unfortunately, it feels just as unexciting to play... overall these sequences are so simple and so short that there isn't anything remotely rousing to the exercise. These parts seem designed to offer a slightly different form of gameplay, but they really don't, and stand largely unmoored" She also felt the narrative wasn't cohesive, and felt mostly like a collection of events and moments. "When I started playing Minute of Islands, I was excited to find out more about its world... The game does a great job of evoking the feeling of a once-lively world with great personal significance to its protagonist, but that's all it is - a collection of assorted memories and vague references, many of them even optional to collect."

References

Further reading

External links 

 

2021 video games
Puzzle-platform games
Nintendo Switch games
PlayStation 4 games
PlayStation 5 games
Windows games
Xbox One games
Single-player games
Video games developed in Germany